Calhoun Township may refer to the following townships in the United States:

 Calhoun Township, Calhoun County, Iowa
 Calhoun Township, Cheyenne County, Kansas